Frank J. Rogers (March 16, 1886 - September 26, 1978) served in the California State Assembly for the 54th district from 1933 to 1935 and during World War I he served in the United States Army.

References

External links
Join California Frank J. Rogers

United States Army personnel of World War I
Democratic Party members of the California State Assembly
1886 births
1978 deaths
20th-century American politicians